We're Children of Coincidence and Harpo Marx was the sixth solo studio LP by Dory Previn, released in 1976 by the Warner Brothers label.  Apart from the download tracks Planet Blue made available in 2002, it was her last set of recordings.

Track listing
"Children of Coincidence""
"I Wake Up Slow"
"Woman Soul"
"The Comedian"
"Fours"
"So Much Trouble"
"Wild Roses (Love Song To The Monster)"
"How'm I Gonna Keep Myself Together"
"The Owl and The Pussycat"

Personnel
Dory Previn - Vocals, Guitar
Wayne Andre - Trombone
Patti Austin - Vocals
Phil Bodner - Flute, Clarinet
David Carey - Percussion
Ron Carter - Bass
Francisco Centeno - Bass
Burt Collins - Trumpet
Judy Clay - Vocals
Jonathan Dorn - Tuba
Bill Eaton - Vocals
Frank Floyd - Vocals
Cissy Houston - Vocals
Peter Jameson - Guitar
Jack Jeffers - Trombone
Arthur Jenkins - Percussion, Keyboards
Hank Jones - Piano
Keith Loving - Guitar
Deborah McDuffie - Vocals
Don McLean - Banjo
Eunice Peterson - Vocals
Seldon Powell - Saxophone
Dom Um Romão - Percussion
Ernie Royal - Trumpet
Joseph J Shepley - Trumpet
Billy Slapin - Flute
Ted Sommers - Drums
Ronelle Stafford - Vocals
John Sussewell - Drums
John Tropea - Guitar
Eric Weissberg - Banjo, Bass
Frank Wess - Saxophone
Ronald Zito - Drums

References

1976 albums
Dory Previn albums
Albums produced by Joel Dorn
Warner Records albums